Felix Chong Man-keung (born December 27, 1968) is a Hong Kong screenwriter, film director and actor.

He is one of the most celebrated screenwriters in Hong Kong and has won several prestigious awards at the Hong Kong Film Awards. Chong is known for frequently working alongside cinematographer/director Andrew Lau, and writer/director Alan Mak.

Chong's best known film as a screenwriter is Infernal Affairs, which he co-wrote alongside Alan Mak. Other films written by Chong include Infernal Affairs 2, Infernal Affairs 3, Initial D, Dance of a Dream, and Confession of Pain.

In 2018, he wrote and directed the film Project Gutenberg, starring Chow Yun-fat and Aaron Kwok.

In Feb 2021, Chong was announced to write and direct the upcoming film Once Upon a Time in Hong Kong, backed by Emperor Motion Pictures and mainland Chinese partners, with a reported budget of around $30.8 million (RMB200 million).

Filmography
 The Sunshine Cops (1999) (writer)
 Gen Y Cops (2000) (writer) (actor)
 Tokyo Raiders (2000) (writer)
 Dance of a Dream (2001) (writer)
 Stolen Love (2001) (writer)
 Shadow (2001) (writer)
 Infernal Affairs (2002) (writer)
 Infernal Affairs II (2003) (writer)
 Infernal Affairs III (2003) (writer)
 Cat and Mouse (2003) (writer)
 Initial D (2005) (writer)
 Moonlight in Tokyo (2005) (writer) (co-directed with Alan Mak)
 Confession of Pain (2006) (writer)
 The Departed (2006) (screenplay base on)
 Lady Cop & Papa Crook (2008) (writer) (co-directed with Alan Mak)
 Overheard (2009) (writer) (co-directed with Alan Mak)
 Once a Gangster (2010) (director)
 The Lost Bladesman (2011) (co-wrote and co-directed with Alan Mak)
 Overheard 2 (2011) (co-wrote and co-directed with Alan Mak)
 The Silent War (2012) (co-wrote and co-directed with Alan Mak)
 Overheard 3 (2014) (co-wrote and co-directed with Alan Mak)
 Project Gutenberg (2018) (director and writer)
 Integrity (2019) (producer)
 Once Upon a Time in Hong Kong (TBD) (director and writer)

Awards

References

External links
 Hong Kong Cinemagic - Felix Chong Man Keung

Living people
1968 births
Hong Kong screenwriters
Hong Kong film directors
Alumni of Hong Kong Baptist University